Troubadour: The Definitive Collection 1964–1976 is the first CD boxed set from Scottish singer-songwriter Donovan, released in the US (Epic/Legacy E2K 46986) on 4 August 1992. It was originally released as a two CD set in a long box. The long box also contained a picture booklet. In 1995, it was released again without the long box and picture booklet.

History
By the early 1990s, CDs were fast becoming the standard format for music. This provided a challenge for artists such as Donovan, whose entire catalog had been issued on vinyl. To rectify the situation, many record companies released CD boxed sets. These boxed sets allowed a more in depth overview than traditional greatest hits or best of compilations. Like greatest hits and best of collections, many of the boxed sets also included rare or previously unreleased recordings as a purchasing incentive for fans who may already have earlier albums.

In a mutually beneficial move for both record company and artist, Epic Records released Troubadour – The Definitive Collection 1964–1976 in 1992. The two disc boxed set features almost all of Donovan's charting singles, many album tracks, and several rare and unreleased tracks. Troubadour – The Definitive Collection 1964–1976 helped put Donovan back in the minds of his older fans, and helped acquaint more recent generations with his music.

The Great Donovan

On 25 November 2003, Australian record label Rajon Records (Rajon 50198) released the compilation under the title  The Great Donovan spread out over three discs.  This collection omits the "Riki Tiki Tavi" outtake included on Troubadour: The Definitive Collection 1964–1976.

Track listing

References

External links
 Troubadour: The Definitive Collection 1964–1976 – Donovan Unofficial Site

Albums produced by Mickie Most
1992 compilation albums
Donovan compilation albums